Wamanpinta (Quechua for Chuquiraga, also spelled Huamampinta) is a mountain in the Cordillera Blanca in the Andes of Peru which reaches a height of approximately . It is located in the Ancash Region, Huaylas Province, on the border of the districts of Caraz and Santa Cruz. Wamanpinta lies on the southern bank of the Yuraqmayu (Santa Cruz gorge).

Sources

Mountains of Peru
Mountains of Ancash Region